Adult Alternative Airplay, also known as Triple A, is a record chart that ranks the most-played songs on American adult album alternative radio stations. Currently published by the music industry magazine Billboard, the chart is formulated based on electronically monitored airplay data compiled by Nielsen Broadcast Data Systems. from a panel of 32 stations. It was introduced in January 1996 as a feature in Radio & Records magazine, which was later purchased by Billboard parent company Nielsen. Billboard appropriated the Radio & Records adult alternative chart in July 2008 and became its sole publisher after Radio & Records ceased publication in June 2009. The first number-one single of the 2010s on the Adult Alternative Songs chart was "Chasing Pirates" by American recording artist Norah Jones, which spent six weeks at the top spot from December 2009 to January 2010.

Number-one singles
Key
 – Billboard year-end number-one single
↑ – Return of a single to number one

Notes

References

External links
 Adult Alternative Songs at Billboard

2010s
United States adult alternative singles